Paladin Academy was an elementary, middle and high school located in Pembroke Pines, Florida. The program catered to students who required smaller class sizes, a more structured environment and if needed, a slower academic pace. This included individuals diagnosed with attention deficits, dyslexia or other undiagnosed challenges. Accredited by the Southern Association of Colleges and Schools, the program was a participant in the State of Florida McKay Scholarship program for students with learning challenges. After over forty years of existence, the school ceased operations in June 2021.

History
Founded in 1978, Dr. Deborah Levy opened the Developmental Resource Center (DRC) in the City of Hollywood in South Florida. The school started as an institution providing a clinical approach to students who suffered from numerous learning differences, helping them to overcome their challenges and gain the tools necessary to become successful academically. In 1998, Nobel Learning Communities purchased the program and renamed it Paladin Academy. The school offered a full college-bound high school program. It was originally accredited under the Commission on International and Trans-Regional Accreditation (CITA SACS) in 2004. With CITA's merger into AdvancED, the accreditation was revised to be under the Southern Association of Colleges and Schools (SACS CASI). In 2008, the school announced that it would be relocating to a facility in western Broward County, near the border of the City of Sunrise and the City of Weston. This move was completed in August of that same year.

In 2011, Paladin Academy started a phased move to a new 4.5 acre campus located in the City of Pembroke Pines. Featuring a regular soccer field, swimming facilities, two technology labs, a science lab, library indoor cafeteria and other numerous upgrades; lower grades of the school started the 2011–2012 academic year at the new location. The high school program, still operated out of the Weston Campus, completed the move in March 2012. Between 2011 and 2016, Paladin Academy won four national awards from Nobel Learning Communities for best operational and financial performance in the country.

In April 2018, the long serving administrative team of Paladin Academy was replaced. Two months later, ownership of the school changed when Nobel Learning Communities was purchased by Spring Education Group. Changes occurred at the school including a new motto of "Academic Success for Courageous Learners" and included a new school mascot, The Paladin, which represented "Warriors for Peace and Kindness".  2019 and 2020 school graduates reflected the highest post-secondary enrollment since the school began. Annual reports from Cognia Accreditation show Paladin Academy had 95 students enrolled in 2020 compared with previous years 

Spring Education Group permanently closed Paladin Academy in June 2021. The property formerly used by the school continues to be owned by 425 Broadway Realty Corp as of Summer 2021.

Curriculum
Paladin Academy utilized an individualized educational model commonly referred to as the Paladin program. Since the transfer of ownership in 1998, the methodologies and techniques used in helping students to overcome their learning challenges were implemented at other Nobel Learning Communities schools throughout the United States. However, a lack of priority for special needs programs by Spring Education Group discontinued most of these initiatives by 2019. From 2005 to 2021, the original Paladin Academy school was the only site to integrate the Paladin program with a college-bound regular high school diploma component. The Paladin program used multi-sensory strategies and specifically chosen support materials to teach, remediate, and facilitate students' individual learning. These strategies were designed to help children with learning challenges "learn how to learn." Included in these strategies were resources and techniques for improving the processing, reading, spelling, math, and language abilities of the students. In addition, the school held goal of helping students add study skills and organizational techniques to their arsenal of learning strategies.

Sister schools
Two sister schools were opened under the name of Developmental Resource Center in the mid 1990s. Following the purchase of the school program in 1998 by Nobel Learning Communities, several additional campuses were put into operation. By 2006, these sister sites had been consolidated. Those schools included:
 Paladin Academy of Boca Raton, Florida
 Paladin Academy of Delray Beach, Florida
 Paladin Academy of Lynnwood, Washington
 Paladin Academy of Miami, Florida

External links 
Official Website

References 

Private elementary schools in Florida
Private middle schools in Florida
High schools in Broward County, Florida
Educational institutions established in 1978
Schools accredited by the Southern Association of Colleges and Schools
Private high schools in Florida
1978 establishments in Florida